The Huriwai River is a river of about  in New Zealand's North Island. The main tributary is the Mangapai Stream.

The river has a waterfall in its upper reach, at the boundary of sandstone and conglomerate rocks. Just north of the river's estuary, the Jurassic rocks have been described by the Geological Society as containing, "amazing fossil leaves and ferns".

At the point where the river is crossed by Waikaretu Road, its water quality is in the lower 50% for macroinvertebrates.

See also
List of rivers of New Zealand

References

External links 

 Google street view of river at Waikaretu Road

Rivers of Waikato
Waikato District
Rivers of New Zealand